Harry Bateman (1896–1976) was an English artist.

Bateman volunteered for the Royal Field Artillery. During World War I, he served as a gunner and signaller in the Somme-Thiepval and Beaumont-Hamel area during April to November 1916 and was hospitalised subsequently.

Bateman was a member of the Fylingdales Group of Artists in Yorkshire. His work is in the collection of the Scarborough Art Gallery.

References

1896 births
1976 deaths
Artists from Yorkshire
British Army personnel of World War I
Royal Field Artillery soldiers
20th-century English painters
English landscape painters